Maniyarayile Ashokan is a 2020 Indian Malayalam-language romantic comedy film directed by Shamzu Zayba. The film stars Jacob Gregory and Anupama Parameswaran. The cast also includes Krishna Sankar and Shine Tom Chacko. The film was produced by Gregory and Dulquer Salmaan, in his newly established production company Wayfarer Films, who made a cameo appearance along with Nazriya Nazim and Anu Sithara as other characters.

Due to the COVID-19 pandemic, the film was directly released through Netflix on 31 August 2020. The film received mixed reviews from critics.

Plot 
Set in a village, the film starts from the wedding night of Ashokan, when the newly-wed wife asks him whether this is his second marriage. Ashokan then recalls his earlier dreams of getting married.

As Ashokan is a single man past "the marital age", he is always questioned by the villagers and  his relatives, including his cousin Ajayan who never misses a chance to tease him. Apart from his loving parents, Ashokan is supported by his friends Ratheesh and Shaiju who stand by him through thick and thin.

Ashokan's father and Narayanan bring the marital proposal for Ashokan to Narayanan's daughter - Anju. Anju rejects the proposal saying that Ashokan isn't fair-skinned or tall enough.

Later Ashokan learns of Shyama's love for him. Despite convincing Shyama's family into marriage, the wedding is called off as Ashokan's horoscope predicts the death of his first wife. Ashokan is heartbroken. Meanwhile, Ratheesh falls in love with Rani Teacher and they get married.

Ashokan consults an astrologer and seeks solutions for the problems in his horoscope. The astrologer asks him to marry a plantain so that no human will get hurt. Ashokan finds a plantain of his choice and marries it. He considers the plantain as a human wife and talks to it regularly. Later the plantain falls off and Ashokan's heart breaks. But it is then revealed that two corms from the plantain are planted again and Ashokan considers these two plantains as his kids.

A new marriage proposal comes but Ashokan is reluctant to agree because he is already married. His friends make him understand the reality in vain. Later Ratheesh brings him into a mental health facility and after talking to his cousin, Arjun, he grasps the reality. He then agrees to the marriage proposal and marries Indu. On the wedding night, he replies to his wife that this is his first marriage.

Cast 

 Jacob Gregory as Ashokan, the main protagonist 
 Anupama Parameswaran as Shyama, love interest of Ashokan
 Krishna Sankar as Ratheesh , friend of Ashokan 
 Shine Tom Chacko as Shaiju, friend of Ashokan 
 Sudheesh as Alex
 Sreelakshmi as Lakshmi, mother of Ashokan.
 Vijayaraghavan as Achuthan, father of Ashokan.
 Kunchan as Narayanan
 Nayana Elza as Rani Teacher, Ratheesh's wife
 Santhosh Keezhattoor as Shyama's father
 Anjali Aneesh as Psychiatrist
 Ranjitha Menon as Asha, wife of Shaiju
 Al Sabith as Shyama's brother 
 Indrans as Priest 
 Dulquer Salmaan as Arjun (cameo)
 Nazriya Nazim as Indhu (cameo)
 Anu Sithara as Unnimaya (cameo)
 Sunny Wayne as Ajayan (cameo)
 Shritha Sivadas as Anju (cameo)
 Ranjini T.H. as Kunju (cameo)
 Onima Kashyap as Olu (cameo)

Production 
It was reported that Dulquer Salmaan will make his debut in film production, for his upcoming project directed by Shamzu Zayba. Anupama Parameswaran announced her return to Malayalam cinema after a hiatus of five years since Premam (2015), and she further revealed that, she would work as an assistant director for this film apart from doing one of the lead roles. After registering his maiden production company titled Wayfarer Films, Dulquer announced the project as their maiden production, which was titled Maniyariyile Ashokan. Comedian-turned-director Ramesh Pisharody was the one who suggested the title for the film. Although Maniyarayile Ashokan was announced as the first production, Wayfarer released Varane Avashyamund to theatres first.

Soundtrack 

The soundtrack album was composed by Sreehari K. Nair, with lyrics by B. K. Harinarayanan, Muzammil Kunnumal, Shamzu Zayba, Ajeesh Dasan, Amir Pallikal and Shihas Ahmedkoya. The song "Unnimaya" was sung by Dulquer Salmaan and Jacob Gregory. The soundtrack album was released on 31 July 2020.

Release 
Maniyarayile Ashokan was scheduled for a release on 10 April 2020, which was postponed due to the COVID-19 pandemic. The film was made available on the streaming platform Netflix on 31 August 2020, coinciding with the Onam festival.

Reception 
The Times of India gave the film 3.5 out of 5 stars and stated "Maniyarayile Ashokan is a slice-of-life story with a genuine dose of humour." Behindwoods gave a rating of 2.75 out of 5 and stated "Maniyarayile Ashokan is a simple story with a big heart, in spite of the slow narration. Watch out for Dulquer and Nazriya’s surprise cameos!" Writing for the Hindustan Times, Haricharan Pudipeddi stated "The film, which revolves around Ashokan (Jacob Gregory) and his attempts to get married, is lighthearted and fun to watch despite its slightly predictable ending." The News Minute gave 3 out of 5 and stated "The typicality of Ashokan’s life, however, fades in the latter part of the film. It starts with some strange advice from a priest but goes on to affect the man all too much. Gregory easily adapts to this new character that emerges from the village guy with the government job. As with the rest of the movie, director Shamzu doesn’t let this unusual part stick too much and the movie ends as sweetly as the description of the village it began with."

Sify gave 2 out of 5 and stated "Maniyarayile Ashokan is a below average comedy-drama which fails to impress." The Indian Express gave 1 out of 5 stars and stated "Shamzu Zayba did not clearly think through the idea. The half baked plot resules in the wannabe slice-of-life movie." Anna M. M. Verticad of Firstpost gave the same and stated "The confirmation of Dulquer’s hotness in a cameo that he spends mostly attired in a Navy outfit is the only worthwhile takeaway from Shamzu Zayba’s Maniyarayile Ashokan." Baradwaj Rangan of Film Companion wrote "In trying to make the proceedings “entertaining”, the film cheats its protagonist, who remains a flat line from start to finish." A review from The Hindu stated "The Malayalam film manages to make us empathise with the protagonist’s plight, but one cannot miss the fact that it does become absurd and unbelievable beyond a point."

References

External links

Maniyarayile Ashokan on m3db

Indian romantic comedy films
2020s Malayalam-language films
2020 films
2020 romantic comedy films
Films not released in theaters due to the COVID-19 pandemic
2020 direct-to-video films